The Man in Black 1954–1958 is a Bear Family Records 5-CD box set of Johnny Cash's music.

The box itself is shaped as a square border box as it holds cases for the discs, and a booklet for a welcome bonus.

Track listing

Song information
Previously unissued:
CD 1: tracks 5, 6, 21, 22
CD 2: tracks 1, 5, 6, 21, 22, 27, 29
CD 3: tracks 1, 13 to 17, 21, 24, 25
CD 4: tracks 1, 2, 7, 8,3
CD 5 contains a complete session: false starts, breakdowns, rejected and finished masters of songs recorded on August 13, 1958.

Numbers next to some songs indicate the year of the release.

Credits
Mastered By - Bob Jones
Producer - Don Law, Jack Clement, Sam Phillips
Reissue Producer - Colin Escott, Richard Weize

References
Bear Family Records
Discogs entry
Amazon.com entry

1990 compilation albums
Johnny Cash compilation albums
Bear Family Records compilation albums